Fort Pierce Inlet State Park, a  part of the Florida State Park system, is located just north  of the Fort Pierce Inlet, on North Hutchinson Island, near Fort Pierce. It consists of beaches, dunes and a coastal hammock between the Atlantic Ocean and the waters of Tucker Cove, an indentation of the Indian River Lagoon.

Recreational Activities
The primary use of the park is as a recreation area. Activities include fishing, swimming, surfing, picnicking, hiking, and birding as well as scuba diving, snorkeling, and youth camping.

Jack Island State Preserve
Jack Island State Preserve, located a mile north of Fort Pierce Inlet State Park on State Road A1A is under the same management as the state park. Jack Island features trails for hiking, biking, and studying nature. At the west end of its Marsh Rabbit Run Trail, there is an observation tower with views of the Indian River and of Jack Island itself.

Gallery

References

External links

Fort Pierce Inlet State Park at Florida State Parks
Fort Pierce Inlet State Park at Wildernet
Fort Pierce Inlet State Park at Absolutely Florida

State parks of Florida
Parks in St. Lucie County, Florida
Fort Pierce, Florida
Indian River Lagoon